Lizard House is an Ancestral Puebloan small house located near Pueblo Bonito in Chaco Culture National Historical Park, New Mexico. Constructed in two phases, starting in the early 12th century, the site is an example of the changing Puebloan architecture of the 12th century.

References

Bibliography

Colorado Plateau
Ancestral Puebloans
Post-Archaic period in North America
Archaeological sites in New Mexico
Chaco Canyon
Chaco Culture National Historical Park